Pictures From Home is a memory play written by Sharr White based on the book, Pictures From Home by photographer Larry Sultan. The first production, directed by Bartlett Sher, opened in previews on 13 January 2023 at the Studio 54 theatre in New York City on Broadway. The play opened on 9 February 2023. The original Broadway cast includes Nathan Lane, Danny Burstein, and Zoë Wanamaker.

Background 
Photographer Larry Sultan began taking photos of his parents beginning in the early 1980s and he spent a decade, interviewing, and writing about his parents, and his relationship with them. The book was adapted by Sharr White into the play, Pictures From Home. The book chronicles his childhood, his upbringing and his relationship with his parents who live in California.

Plot 
The show is a domestic comedic drama, and exploration into the relationship between a son who is a photographer and his parents who live in California. The cast includes Danny Burstein as the son and photographer, Nathan Lane as the father and former razor salesman, and Zoë Wanamaker as his mother who later in life became a realtor. The production spans 1 hour and 45 minutes with no intermission.

Cast

Productions 
The play originated on Broadway at the Studio 54 theatre in 2023. The roles were originated by Burstein, Lane, and Wanamaker.

References 

Works set in the 1980s
Broadway plays
Fiction set in 1980
Plays set in California